Ashmoun is a city in the south of Monufia Governorate, Egypt. 

The city's Arabic name comes from Coptic Chmoumi, of unclear etymology, that could be possibly related to a Coptic word for "spring, source".

See also

 List of cities and towns in Egypt

References

External links
 Ashmoun Facebook Page

Populated places in Monufia Governorate